Ctenosia psectriphora is a moth of the subfamily Arctiinae. It was described by William Lucas Distant in 1899. It is found in South Africa.

References

Endemic moths of South Africa
Lithosiini
Moths described in 1899